Bob Bryan and Mike Bryan were the defending champions, but Julien Benneteau and Michaël Llodra defeated them 6–4, 4–6, [10–8], in the final.

Seeds

Draw

Draw

External links
 Draw

Doubles